Phoenicia Hotel may refer to:

Phoenicia Hotel Beirut, Lebanon
Hotel Phoenicia, Floriana, Malta